The 2018 Judo Grand Slam Paris was held in Paris, France, from 10 to 11 February 2018.

Medal summary

Men's events

Women's events

Source Results

Medal table

References

External links
 

2018 IJF World Tour
2018 Judo Grand Slam
Judo
Grand Slam Paris 2018
Judo
Judo